Isi & Ossi is a 2020 German romantic comedy film directed and written by Oliver Kienle, starring Dennis Mojen, Lisa Vicari, Christina Hecke and Pegah Ferydoni. The story revolves around a billionaire's daughter and a struggling boxer who are each other's opposites, and initially start dating to take advantage of each other.

It was released on 14 February 2020 by Netflix.

Plot

Isabelle "Isi" Voigt lives with her upper-class family in Heidelberg while Oscar "Ossi" Markowski lives with his single mother in a small flat in Mannheim. Despite her privileged upbringing and her parents' wishes for her to attend university, Isi aspires to attend a culinary school in New York and become a chef. Ossi trains to become a professional boxer but is forced to frequently miss training sessions and work at his mother's gas station.

Ossi's mother, Betty, is €14,000 in debt and Ossi's sponsor for his upcoming professional match has pulled out, believing that Ossi's frequent absences from training display a lack of commitment. This leaves Ossi in need of €8000 for his match to continue. Isi requests access to her deposit account to fund her culinary ambitions, but her mother, Claudia, informs her that she will not get the money until she turns 25 and has graduated from university. Isi then applies for a job at a burger joint in Mannheim, meeting Ossi there. She asks Ossi out in order to blackmail her parents into allowing her access to her inheritance. After a discussion with his mother and his best friend, Tschünni, Ossi reluctantly agrees to date Isi for money.

After a bad "first date" where Isi's parents find and interrupt the fake couple, Isi ends up joining Ossi in picking his grandfather up from prison. Grandpa had been in and out of prison for 14 years and is ecstatic in reuniting with his grandson, although Ossi is embarrassed to be associated with him, even more so when Grandpa reveals his ambition to become a professional rapper. Fed up with Grandpa and no longer wanting to deceive Isi, Ossi reveals to her that he just wanted to swindle €8000 out of her. The two meet again later and Isi offers to pay for Ossi's fight on the condition that they continue to pretend to be a couple; if she successfully gains access to her inheritance, she will provide him with €25,000 in total.

The two meet up with Grandpa at a nightclub where he participates in a rap battle. He initially fumbles much to Ossi's embarrassment, but soon wins over the crowd with his rapping and humorous insults towards his opponent. Isi and Ossi begin to bond over their shared interests and support each other's ambitions. Isi genuinely respects Ossi's family and their lack of pretension. Ossi also displays academic excellence, which makes Isi wonder if he could have achieved more in life if he had her educational experience and upbringing. Still, he reiterates his true dream of fighting professionally.

A video of Grandpa's rapping goes viral and he lands a record deal. He, Isi, Ossi and Tschünni celebrate at a nightclub. Isi further encourages Ossi to pursue better boxing management in Frankfurt and to leave his mother's gas station behind. They make out unprompted and go back to Ossi's place, where he takes care of her in her drunken state. Isi comments that Betty does not appear to like her, which Ossi denies.

The next morning, Isi's parents appear at Ossi's flat and grants her access to her deposit account. They demand that she end her relationship with Ossi, which she verbally agrees to in order to placate her parents, but Ossi overhears this and assumes that Isi will abandon him. While they have breakfast, Isi transfers the €25,000 into Ossi's account as agreed, but he treats her coldly. An argument escalates as Isi tells him that he does not have to incur his mother's debts due to her financial irresponsibility; Ossi argues that he will not abandon his family and suggests that rich people do not understand what it means to support one another. Isi leaves.

The breakup affects Isi badly and she accidentally gets her kind but dim-witted coworker, Gabriella, fired. Ossi's boxing also suffers from the breakup. Isi discovers that she has over two million euros in her account and anonymously donates some of it to Gabriella. Grandpa's rapping career takes off and he tells Ossi that he has earned €30,000. Ossi meets Isi outside of her mansion and returns her €25,000. Although she insists on him keeping the money, they get into another argument where they accuse the other of deceiving them from the beginning. Isi also claims that Betty has been an irresponsible mother. Ossi returns the money and storms off. Isi's parents overhear the argument and realise that the two genuinely cared for each other. Claudia apologizes to her daughter and confesses that she had discouraged Isi's dream in order for her to live a life free of poverty, which she had experienced as a child.

While Isi is working, Ossi appears at the burger joint in need of her car; they rush to stop Grandpa in the middle of a fight with a youth who insulted him online. Ossi calms his grandfather, who admits that he is having trouble readjusting to society. Ossi comforts Grandpa and assures that he will help him. When Isi and Ossi are left alone, the latter confesses his love for her and reveals his insecurity that he may not be good enough for Isi.

Ossi returns to his mother's gas station where she tells him to fleece Isi for more money. Seeing Betty's irresponsibility and lack of respect towards Isi for the first time, he refuses. He tells his mother to sell the gas station and find another job, leaving her for his upcoming match.

At the boxing venue, Ossi nervously awaits his first professional match. Betty arrives to support her son; she apologizes for her previous actions and promises him that she will find another job. Grandpa and Tschünni are also in attendance.

Isi arrives at the match and sees Ossi struggling against his opponent. She rushes to his side during the rest period and affirms her love for him and Ossi's worth as a person, also telling him that she has bought the burger joint and will stay in Germany with him. Ossi tells her that he may not be able to buy her luxuries; Isi playfully retorts that she accepts that so long as he does not make fun of her tastes. Reinvigorated, he fights his opponent aggressively and finally defeats him. Isi, Betty, Grandpa and Tschünni rush into the ring and embrace Ossi, celebrating his victory.

Production
Isi & Ossi was shot in three locations: Berlin, Mannheim and Heidelberg. Filming took place in one month.

Cast
 Lisa Vicari as Isabelle "Isi" Voigt
 Dennis Mojen as Oscar "Ossi" Markowski
 Walid Al-Atiyat as Tschünni, Ossi's best friend
 Christina Hecke as Claudia Voigt
 Ernst Stötzner as Grandpa
 Lisa Hagmeister as Betty Markowski, Ossi's mother
 Hans-Jochen Wagner as Manfred Voigt, Isi's father
 André Eisermann as Ossi's Coach
 Zoë Straub as Camilla, Isi's best friend
 Pegah Ferydoni as teacher

Reception

Greg Wheeler of The Review Geek wrote: "A boy and a girl from polar opposite backgrounds come together and find love. It’s one of the oldest rom-com tropes in the book and yet every year there’s a whole wave of titles that rehash this idea and put a slightly different spin on it... Step forward German Netflix film Isi & Ossi that takes this cliched idea, intertwines two big dreams together to produce an indifferent, painting by numbers picture that does little to stand out from so many others out there." Wheeler, however, praised the performances of Vicari and Mojen and their natural chemistry.

References

External links
 
 

2020 films
2020 romantic comedy films
2020s sports comedy films
German boxing films
Films about social class
Films set in Heidelberg
Films shot in Berlin
German-language Netflix original films
German romantic comedy films
German sports comedy films